Frontier Flying Service (d/b/a Ravn Connect) was an American airline headquartered in Fairbanks, Alaska, United States. It operated an extensive network of year-round scheduled commuter services and postal services to Alaska bush communities, primarily north of Fairbanks, as well as charter services to the lower 48 and Canada.

Its main base was in Fairbanks (Fairbanks International Airport), with hubs in Utqiagvik (Wiley Post–Will Rogers Memorial Airport), Anchorage (Ted Stevens Anchorage International Airport), Kotzebue (Ralph Wien Memorial Airport) and Bethel (Bethel Airport).

History
Frontier Flying Service was established in 1950 by retired Air Force Colonel Richard McIntyre, catering to Alaska bush communities as a scheduled mail carrier for Wien Air Alaska, as well as providing charters throughout Alaska. In 1974, Frontier was purchased by John Hajdukovich.

In 2005 the airline merged with Cape Smythe Air Services, taking on their routes and retaining the Frontier Flying Service name.

During the spring of 2008 Frontier Flying Service began the process of merging with Hageland Aviation Services, the companies continue to operate separate certificates with Frontier Flying Service providing service between major hubs and focus communities with the Beech 1900C aircraft while Hagleand Air Service provides point to point service out of the hubs and focus communities to smaller villages, both companies do business under the name "Frontier Alaska" and have begun merging resources and operations at all their shared airports. This merger makes Frontier Alaska the largest commuter passenger carrier in the state of Alaska (by fleet size and number of routes).

On July 8, 2008, Seattle-based Alaska Airlines announced Frontier Flying Service (d.b.a Frontier Alaska) as a new code share partner beginning in the fall of 2008.

On February 27, 2009, Frontier Flying Service's holding company, Frontier Alaska, acquired rival Era Aviation of Anchorage, Alaska.

By 2014, with the fleet rationalization and post acquisition of Era Aviation almost complete by the HoTH Airline group, Frontier Flying Service performed the mission of flying cargo and passenger charters for the other Ravn branded companies, Corvus Airlines and Hageland Aviation, but also utilizing the branding of Ravn Connect.

After the bankruptcy of Ravn Alaska the assets were sold "in pieces" to other airlines of Alaska in July 2020.

Fleet
The Frontier Flying Service fleet consisted of the following aircraft:

Destinations
Frontier Flying Service operated scheduled service to the following destinations in Alaska as of 2007:

Anchorage (ANC) - Ted Stevens Anchorage International Airport
Aniak (ANI) - Aniak Airport
Anvik (ANV) - Anvik Airport
Atqasuk (ATK) - Atqasuk Edward Burnell Sr. Memorial Airport
Barrow (BRW) - Wiley Post–Will Rogers Memorial Airport
Barter Island / Kaktovik (BTI) - Barter Island LRRS Airport
Bethel (BET) - Bethel Airport
Brevig Mission (KTS) - Brevig Mission Airport
Buckland (BKC) - Buckland Airport
Deadhorse (SCC) - Deadhorse Airport
Deering (DRG) - Deering Airport
Elim (ELI) - Elim Airport
Fairbanks (FAI) - Fairbanks International Airport
Fort Yukon (FYU) - Fort Yukon Airport
Galena (GAL) - Edward G. Pitka Sr. Airport
Gambell (GAM) - Gambell Airport
Golovin (GLV) - Golovin Airport
Grayling (KGX) - Grayling Airport
Holy Cross (HCR) - Holy Cross Airport
Huslia (HSL) - Huslia Airport
Kalskag (KLG) - Kalskag Airport
Kaltag (KAL) - Kaltag Airport
Kiana (IAN) - Bob Baker Memorial Airport
Kivalina (KVL) - Kivalina Airport
Kotzebue (OTZ) - Ralph Wien Memorial Airport
Koyuk (KKA) - Koyuk Alfred Adams Airport
Koyukuk (KYU) - Koyukuk Airport
Noatak (WTK) - Noatak Airport
Nome (OME) - Nome Airport
Noorvik (ORV) - Robert (Bob) Curtis Memorial Airport
Nuiqsut (AQT/NUI) - Nuiqsut Airport
Nulato (NUL) - Nulato Airport
Point Hope (PHO) - Point Hope Airport
Point Lay (PIZ) - Point Lay LRRS Airport
Ruby (RBY) - Ruby Airport
Russian Mission (RSH) - Russian Mission Airport
Savoonga (SVA) - Savoonga Airport
Selawik (WLK) - Selawik Airport
Shageluk (SHX) - Shageluk Airport
Shishmaref (SHH) - Shishmaref Airport
St. Mary's (KSM) - St. Mary's Airport
Tanana (TAL) - Ralph M. Calhoun Memorial Airport
Teller (TLA) - Teller Airport
Wainwright (AIN) - Wainwright Airport
Wales (WAA) - Wales Airport
White Mountain (WMO) - White Mountain Airport

Community awareness 
Frontier Flying Service, along with Bering Air, Grant Aviation, Northern Air Cargo, PenAir, and Ryan Air, participated in the Flying Can service, which allows rural Alaskan communities to recycle aluminum cans and PET bottles in cooperation with Alaskans for Litter Prevention and Recycling.

Accidents and incidents
On October 30, 1979, Douglas C-47B N99663 was written off in a landing accident at Bettles Airport, Alaska. The aircraft struck three parked aircraft. It was on a cargo flight from Fairbanks International Airport, Alaska, to Ambler Airport, Alaska via Bettles. All four aircraft were substantially damaged.

See also 
 List of defunct airlines of the United States

References

1950 establishments in Alaska
2009 disestablishments in Alaska
Airlines established in 1950
Airlines based in Alaska
Defunct airlines of the United States
Companies based in Fairbanks, Alaska
American companies established in 1950